Pandu railway station is a small railway station in Guwahati, Assam. Its code is PNO.

Location 
It is located near Guwahati City.

References

External links

Railway stations in Guwahati
Lumding railway division
Railway terminus in India